This article is a list of English-language nonfiction books which have been described by reliable sources as in some way directly relating to the subject of Antarctica, its history, geography, people, etc.

Adie, Raymond J. - Antarctic Geology and Geophysics: Proceedings of a symposium, Oslo, Norway, August 1970.
Alexander, Caroline - The Endurance: Shackleton's legendary Antarctic expedition.Amundsen, Roald - Race to the South Pole.Antarctica: Compiled from All Available Sources to 1943, Including the Results of All American Expeditions from the United States Exploring Expedition 1839–1841 to the United States Antarctic Service 1940–1941. Antarctica in the International Geophysical Year: Based on a Symposium on the Antarctic.Arnesen, Liv - No horizon is so far: two women and their extraordinary journey across Antarctica.Auburn, F. M. – Antarctic Law and Politics. 
Bancroft, Ann, Liv Arnesen, and Cheryl Dahle – No Horizon Is so Far: A Historic Journey across Antarctica. 
Barczewski, Stephanie L. - Antarctic destinies: Scott, Shackleton and the changing face of heroism.Baughman, T. H. - Before the Heroes Came: Antarctica in the 1890s.Beals, Herbert K. - Four Travel Journals: The Americas, Antarctica, and Africa.Behrendt, John C. - Innocents on the ice: a memoir of Antarctic exploration.Belanger, Dian Olson – Deep Freeze: The United States, the International Geophysical Year, and the Origins of Antarctica's Age of Science. The Belgian Expedition under the Command of A. de Gerlache de Gomery. 
Bertram, Colin - Antarctica, Cambridge, Conservation and Population: A Biologist's Story.Bertram, Colin – Antarctica Sixty Years Ago: A Re-Appraisal of the British Graham Land Expedition 1934–37. 
Bickel, Lennard - Mawson's will: the greatest polar survival story ever written.Bickel, Lennard - Shackleton's forgotten men: the untold tragedy of the endurance epic.Boggs, S. W. - The Polar Regions: Geographical and Historical Data for Consideration in a Study of Claims to Sovereignty in the Arctic and Antarctic Regions.Bohme, Rolf – Inventory of World Topographic Mapping. Volume 3: Eastern Europe, Asia, Oceania and Antarctica. 
Burke, David - Voyage to the end of the world: with tales from the great ice barrier.Burns, Robin - Just tell them I survived: women in Antarctica.Bush, W. M. - Antarctica and International Law: A Collection of Inter-state and National Documents.Byrd, Richard Evelyn - Alone: the classic polar adventure.Caesar, Adrian - The White: Last Days in the Antarctic Journeys of Scott and Mawson, 1911–1913.Cassidy, William A. – Meteorites, Ice, and Antarctica: A Personal Account. 
Charney, Jonathan I. - The New Nationalism and the Use of Common Spaces: Issues in Marine Pollution and the Exploration of Antarctica.Cherry-Garrard, Apsley - The Worst Journey in the World: Antarctic, 1910–1913.Chester, S. – A Wildlife Guide to Chile, Continental Chile, Chilean Antarctica, Easter Island, Juan Fernandez Archipelago. 
Child, Jack - Antarctica and South American Geopolitics: Frozen Lebensraum.Cokinos, Christopher - The Fallen Sky: An Intimate History of Shooting Stars.Collier, Graham - Antarctic odyssey: in the footsteps of the South Polar explorers.Copeland, Sebastian. Antarctica: The Global Warning.Cox, Lynne - Swimming to Antarctica: Tales of a Long-Distance Swimmer.Croizat, Leon - Manual of Plant-Geography or an Account of Plant-Dispersal throughout the World.De Witt, Maarten J. – Minerals and Mining in Antarctica: Science and Technology, Economics and Politics. 
Diski, Jenny - Skating to Antarctica: Skating to the End of the World.Does, Willem van der - Storms, ice, and whales: the Antarctic adventures of a Dutch artist on a Norwegian whaler.Ecklund, Carl R. and Joan Beckman - Antarctica: Polar Research and Discovery During the International Geophysical Year.Edholm, O. G. and E. K. E. Gunderson – Polar Human Biology: The Proceedings of the SCAR/IUPS/IUBS Symposium on Human Biology and Medicine in the Antarctic. 
English, Robert A. J. - Sailing Directions for Antarctica, Including the Off-Lying Islands South of Latitude 60 degrees.Ferguson, A. – Geological Observations in the South Shetlands, the Palmer Archipelago, and Graham Land, Antarctica. 
Fiennes, Ranulph - Captain Scott.Fiennes, Ranulph - Mind Over Matter: The Epic Crossing of the Antarctic Continent.Fiennes, Ranulph - Race to the Pole: tragedy, heroism, and Scott's Antarctic quest.Fox, Robert - Antarctica and the South Atlantic: Discovery, Development and Dispute.Fox, William L. - Terra Antarctica: Looking into the Emptiest Continent.Francioni, Francesco and Tullio Scovazzi – International Law for Antarctica. 
Fuchs, Arved - In Shackleton's wake.Geophysical Monograph No. 1. Antarctica in the I. G. Y. 
Giæver, John - The White Desert: The Norwegian-British-Swedish Antarctic Expedition.Gorman, James - Ocean enough and time: discovering the waters around Antarctica.Grattan, C. Hartley – The Southwest Pacific Since 1900. A Modern History: Australia, New Zealand, the Islands, Antarctica. 
Grattan, C. Hartley - The Southwest Pacific to 1900: A Modern History: Australian, New Zealand, the Islands, Antarctica.Green, Bill - Water, ice & stone: science and memory on the Antarctic lakes.Greene, Dorothy M. – A Conspectus of the Mosses of Antarctica, South Georgia, the Falkland Islands and Southern South America. 
Gressitt, J. L. - Entomology of Antarctica, Vol. 10, Antarctic Research Series.Griffiths, Tom - Slicing the silence: voyaging to Antarctica.Gunn, B. M. and Guyon Warren - Geology 4: Geology of Victoria Land between the Mawson and Mulock Glaciers, Antarctica.Gurney, Alan - Below the Convergence: Voyages Toward Antarctica, 1699–1839.Gurney, Alan - The race to the white continent.Hall, Lincoln - The Loneliest Mountain: the dramatic story of the first expedition to climb Mt Minto, Antarctica.Hanc, John - The coolest race on earth: mud, madmen, glaciers, and grannies at the Antarctica marathon.Harrison, Albert A. & Yvonne Clearwater - From Antarctica to Outer Space: Life in Isolation and Confinement.Hartman, Olga – Polychaeta Errantia of Antarctica. Volume 3, Antarctic Research Series. 
Hartman, Olga – Polychaeta Myzostomidae and Sedentarian of the Antarctica. Volume 7, Antarctic Research Series. 
Hartman, Olga – Polychaetous Annelids Collected by the USNS Eitanin and Staten Island Cruises Chiefly from Antarctic Seas. Allan Hancock Monographs in Biology, No. 2.Hayes, J. Gordon – Antarctica: A Treatise on the Southern Continent. 
Herzefeld, Ute Christina - Atlas of Antarctica: Topographic Maps from Geostatistical Analysis of Satellite Radar Altimeter Data.Higgins, P. J., J. M. Peter, and W. K. Steele – Handbook of Australian, New Zealand and Antarctic Birds. Volume 5 Tyrant-Flycatchers to Chats. 
Hisdal, V., O. A. Amble, and N. J. Schumacher – Norwegian-British-Swedish Antarctic Expedition, 1949–1952. Scientific Results: Vol. 1, Meteorology: Part 2, Surface Observations; Sub-Part 1, Air Pressure. 
Hobbs, William Herbert - The Discoveries of Antarctica within the American Sector, as Revealed by Maps and Documents.Holdgate, M. W. - Antarctic Ecology: Based on a symposium, Cambridge, England, 1968.Hooper, Meredith - The Ferocious Summer: Palmer's Penguins and the Warming of Antarctica. Alternatively published under the title: The Ferocious Summer: Adelie Penguins and the Warming of Antarctica.Huntford, Roland - The Last Place on Earth (aka Scott and Amundsen).Huntford, Roland - Shackleton.Husseiny, A. A. – Iceberg Utilization: Proceedings of the First International Conference and Workshops on Iceberg Utilization for Fresh Water Production, Weather Modification and Other Applications Held at Iowa State University, Ames, Iowa, USA, 2-6 Oct. 1977. 
Jacquet, Luc, photos by Jerome Maison, trans. by Donnali Fifield - March of the Penguins.Johnson, Nicholas - Big Dead Place: Inside the Strange and Menacing World of Antarctica.Johnson, Rebecca L. - Science on the Ice: An Antarctic Journal.Jones, A. G. E. – Antarctica Observed: Who Discovered the Antarctic Continent? 
Jones, Max - The last great quest: Captain Scott's Antarctic sacrifice.Joyner, Christopher C. and Sudhir K. Chopra - The Antarctic Legal Regime.Kearns, David A. - ''''Where hell freezes over: a story of amazing bravery and survival.
Kelly, Philip and Jack Child – Geopolitics of the Southern Cone and Antarctica.
Kolbert, Elizabeth, ed. with Francis Spufford - The Ends of the Earth: An Anthology of the finest writing on the Arctic and the Antarctic.
Landis, Marilyn J. - Antarctica: exploring the extreme: 400 years of adventure.
Lansing, Alfred - Endurance: Shackleton's incredible voyage.
Lee, Richard E., Jr. and David L. Denlinger - Insects at Low Temperature.
Legler, Gretchen - On the Ice: An Intimate Portrait of Life at McMurdo Station, Antarctica.
Liljequist, G. H. - Norwegian-British-Swedish Antarctic Expedition, 1949–1952. Scientific Results: Vol. II, Meteorology: Part 1, Energy Exchange of an Antarctic Snowfield, Sub-Part A, Short-Wave Radiation, 1956; Sub Part B, Long-Wave Radiation and Radiation Balance, 1956; Sub-Part C, Wind Structure in the Low Layer, 1957; Sub-Part D, Surface Inversions and Turbulent Heat Transfer, 1957. 
Liljequist, G. H. - Norwegian-British-Swedish Antarctic Expedition, 1949–1952. Scientific Results: Vol. II, Meteorology: Part 2, Special Studies. Sub-Part A, Halo-Phenomena and Ice Crystals. 
Lizotte, Michael and Kevin Arrigo – Antarctic Sea Ice: Biological Processes, Interactions and Variability, Antarctic Research Series, Vol. 73. 
Lorentsen, S.-H. - Reproductive Effort in the Antarctic Petrel Thalassoica Antarctica: The Effect of Parental Body Size and Condition.
Lynch, Wayne - Penguins of the world.
MacDowall, Joseph – On Floating Ice: Two Years on an Antarctic Ice-Shelf. 
Mastro, Jim, with Norbert Wu - Under Antarctic Ice: The Photographs of Norbert Wu.
Mathews, Eleanor - Ambassador to the penguins: a naturalist's year aboard a yankee whaleship.
Matthiessen, Peter - End of the Earth: Voyages to Antarctica.
Mawson, Douglas, Sir - The Home of the Blizzard: A True Story of Antarctic Survival.
McGonigal, David - Antarctica: Secrets of the Southern Continent.
McSween, Harry Y. - Meteorites and Their Parent Planets.
Mercy, David - Berserk: my voyage to Antarctica in a twenty-seven-foot sailboat.
Moorehead, Alan - The Fatal Impact: An Account of the Invasion of the South Pacific, 1767–1840.
Morris, Michael M. – Great Power Reliations in Argentina, Chile and Antarctica. 
Murphy, Joseph E. - South to the Pole by ski: nine men and two women pioneer a new route to the South Pole.
Murphy, Robert Cushman – Oceanic Birds of South America. A Study of Species of the Related Coasts and Seas, Including the American Quadrant of Antarctica Based Upon the Brewster-Sanford Collection in the American Museum of Natural History:Volumes I and II. 
Myers, Joan - Wondrous cold: an Antarctic journey.
Myhre, Jeffrey D. – The Antarctic Treaty System: Politics, Law and Diplomacy. 
Naveen, Ron - Waiting to fly: my escapades with the penguins of Antarctica.
Nicoll, Alastair Vere -Riding the Ice Wind: By Kite and Sledge Across Antarctica.
Norsenskjold, N. Otto G. and Joh. Gunnar Andersson – Antarctica, or Two Years amongst the Ice of the South Pole. 
Ochyra, Ryszard - The illustrated moss flora of Antarctica.
Ochyra, Ryszard - The Moss Flora of King George Island, Antarctica.
Ovstedal, DO and RI Lewis Smith – Lichens of Antarctica and South Georgia: A Guide to Their Identification and Ecology. 
Parker, Bruce C. – Proceedings of the Colloquium on Conservation Problems in Antarctica. Blackburg, Va., Sept. 1971. 
Parsons, Anthony – Antarctica: The Next Decade: Report of a Study Group. 
Patterson, Diana - The ice beneath my feet: my year in Antarctica.
Peterson, M. J. – Managing the Frozen South: The Creation and Evolution of the Antarctic Treaty System. 
Philbrick, Nathaniel - Sea of Glory: America's voyage of discovery: the U. S. Exploring Expedition, 1838–1842.
Plimpton, George - Ernest Shackleton.
Polar Research Board – Antarctic Treaty System: An Assessment. Proceedings of a Workshop Held at Beardmore South Field Camp, Antarctica, January 7–13, 1985. 
Price, A. Grenfell – The Winning of Australian Antarctica: Mawson's B.A.N.Z.A.R.E. Voyages 1929-1931: Based on the Mawson Papers. 
Priestley, Raymond, Raymond J. Adie and G. de Q. Robin - Antarctic Research: A Review of British Scientific Achievement in Antarctica.
Priscu, John C. – Ecosystems Dynamics in a Polar Desert: The McMurdo Dry Valleys, Antarctic research Series, Vol. 72. 
Pyne, Stephen J. – The Ice: A Journey to Antarctica. 
Quam, Louis O. & Horace D. Porter - Research in the Antarctic: A symposium, Dallas, Texas, Dec. 1968.
Quartermain, L. B. - South to the Pole: The Early History of the Ross Sea Sector, Antarctica.
Quigg, Philip W. - A Pole Apart: The Emerging Issue of Antarctica.
Riffenburgh, Beau, ed. - Encyclopedia of the Antarctic.
Riffenburgh, Beau - Shackleton's forgotten expedition: the voyage of the Nimrod.
Roberts, Leslie Carol - The Entire Earth and Sky: Views on Antarctica.
Robertson, Hugh and Barrie Heather – The Hand Guide to the Birds of New Zealand. 
Rodgers, Eugene - Beyond the Barrier: The Story of Byrd's First Expedition to Antarctica.
Rose, Lisle A. – Assault on Eternity: Richard E. Byrd and the Exploration of Antarctica, 1946–47. 
Rosove, Michael H. - Let heroes speak: Antarctic explorers, 1772–1922.
Ross, M. J. – Ross in the Antarctic: The Voyages of James Clark Ross in Her Majesty's Ships ‘’Erebus’’ and ‘’Terror’’ 1839–1843.
Rudmose-Brown, R. N. – The Polar Regions: A Physical and Economic Geography of the Arctic and Antarctic. 
Sanderson, Marie - Griffith Taylor: Antarctic Scientist and Pioneer Geographer.
Schytt, V. - Snow and Ice Studies in Antarctica: Norwegian-British-Swedish Antarctic Expedition, 1949–52.
Science in Antarctica: A Report by the Committee on Polar Research.
Scott, Jonathan and Angela Scott - Antarctica: Exploring a Fragile Eden.
Scott, Robert Falcon - Journals: Captain Scott's last expedition.
Scott, Robert Falcon - Scott's last expedition: the journals.
Scott, Robert Falcon - The Voyage of the Discovery.
Shackleton, Ernest Henry - Escape from the Antarctic.
Shackleton, Ernest Henry - The heart of the Antarctic: being the story of the British Antarctic Expedition, 1907–1909.
Shackleton, Ernest Henry - Shackleton, his Antarctic writings.
Shackleton, Ernest Henry - South: the Endurance expedition.
Shackleton, Jonathan - Shackleton: an Irishman in Antarctica.
Shapiro, Deborah - Time on ice: a winter voyage to Antarctica.
Shirihai, Hadoram - The Complete Guide to Antarctic Wildlife: birds and marine mammals of the Antarctic continent and the Southern Ocean, 2nd ed.
Shulman, Neville - Some Like It Cold: Arctic and Antarctic expeditions.
Simpson, George Gaylord – Splendid Isolation. 
Simpson, Ken, Nicholas Day, and Peter Trusler - Birds of Antarctica.
Simpson-Housley, Paul - Antarctica: Exploration, Perception, and Metaphor.
Smith, Michael - Tom Cream: unsung hero of the Scott and Shackleton Antarctic expeditions.
Smith, Roff Martin - Life on the Ice: No One Goes to Antarctica Alone.
Solomon, Susan - The Coldest March: Scott's Fatal Antarctic Expedition.
The South Pole: a historical reader.
Spufford, Francis - I May Be Some Time: Ice and the English Imagination.
Stokke, Olav Schram and Davor Vidas – Governing the Antarctic: The Effectiveness and Legitimacy of the Antarctic Treaty System. 
Stone, Greg - Ice island: the expedition to Antarctica's largest iceberg.
Stroud, Mike - Shadows on the Wasteland.
Suggate, L. S. - Australia and New Zealand, with Pacific Islands and Antarctica.
Swan, Robert - Antarctica 2041: My Quest to Save the Earth's Last Wilderness.
Swithinbank, Charles – An Alien in Antarctica: Reflections upon Forty Years of Exploration and Research on the Frozen Continent. 
Swithinbank, Charles – Foothold on Antarctica: The First International Expedition (1949–1952) through the Eyes of Its Youngest Member. 
Thomas, David N., G. E. (Tony) Fogg, Peter Convey, Christian H. Fritsen, Josep-Maria Gili, Rold Gradinger, Johanna Laybourn-Parry, Keith Reid, and David W. H. Walton - The Biology of Polar Regions: Revised Edition. Biology of Habitats.
Thomson, David - Scott, Shackleton, and Amundesen: ambition and tragedy in the Antarctic.
Triggs, Gillian D. – The Antarctic Treaty Regime: Law, Environment and Resources. 
Tulloch, Coral - Antarctica: The Heart of the World.
Tyler-Lewis, Kelly - The Lost Men: the Harrowing Story of Shackleton's Ross Sea Party.
Tyrell, G. W. – A Contribution to the Petrography of the South Shetland Islands, the Palmer Archipelago, and the Danco Land Coast, Antarctica. 
United Nations General Assembly – Question of Antarctica: Report of the Secretary-General. 
Vicuna, Francisco Orrego - Antarctic Mineral Exploitation: The Emerging Framework.
Vicuna, Francisco Orrego – Antarctic Resources Policy: Scientific, Legal and Political Issues.
Wainwright, J. A. - Flight of the Falcon: Scott's Journey to the South Pole 1910–1912.
Weyers, Chris - White demon: one man's quest for the South Pole.
Wheeler, Sara - Cherry: a life of Apsley Cherry-Garrard.
Wheeler, Sara - Terra incognita: travels in Antarctica.
Williams, Isobel - With Scott in the Antarctic: Edward Wilson, Explorer, Naturalist, Artist.
Worsley, Frank Arthur - Endurance: An Epic of Polar Adventure.
Worsley, Frank Arthur - Shackleton's Boat Journey.

Notes

Antarctica
 bib
Antarctica-related lists